The Meriden Gap is a mostly rural area located in the West Midlands between Solihull and Coventry. It serves as a part of the wider West Midlands Green Belt, and separates the latter from the large West Midlands conurbation, which includes Birmingham and Wolverhampton. The 'Gap' takes its name from the village central to  the area, Meriden, although the largest settlement is Balsall Common. The highest point lies at 181m / 594 ft above sea level, slightly north of the hamlet of Eaves Green near the West Midlands-Warwickshire border.

The majority of the gap falls within the Metropolitan Borough of Solihull with a small area falling within Warwickshire and some of the northeastern part being in the City of Coventry. Other villages and hamlets within the gap include Hampton-in-Arden, Berkswell, Barston, Temple Balsall, Eastcote, Bradnocks Marsh, Millison's Wood, Eaves Green, Four Oaks, Fen End, Pickford Green and Corley Moor.

The gap is largely covered by the Meriden parliamentary constituency.

Urban pressure
The area is under pressure from housing and business developments in the surrounding urban areas.

The planned expansion of Birmingham Airport outlines the need for construction upon the greenbelt to allow the expansion to happen. Despite opposition to the expansion plans, the proposal was granted approval. A motorway service area between J3a and J7 on the M42 motorway has been proposed on several occasions.

References

Areas of the West Midlands (county)
Geography of Warwickshire
Solihull
Coventry